W. W. Samuell High School and Early College is a public secondary school located in the Pleasant Grove area of Dallas, Texas, US. Samuell High enrolls students in grades 9–12 and is a part of the Dallas Independent School District. The school serves portions of southeast Dallas and a portion of the city of Balch Springs.

In 2015, the school was rated "met standard" by the Texas Education Agency.

History 
Dallas ISD annexed Pleasant Grove ISD in 1954, and Pleasant Grove High School (now John Quincy Adams Elementary School) was replaced by the newly constructed Samuell High School in 1956–57.  In the 1950s and early 1960s, a number of new housing developments in the Pleasant Grove area made Samuell one of Dallas' largest high schools; a new wing was opened in the mid-1960s to handle the increase in population.  H. Grady Spruce and Skyline high schools, two historical rivals and closest schools to Samuell, were opened in 1963 and 1971 to help reduce attendance.

Dr. William Worthington Samuell was a wealthy individual who before his death donated millions of dollars to the City of Dallas Parks and Recreation Department. There are now at least six institutions named after Dr. Samuell in the Dallas area, including the high school, a boulevard, a City of Dallas ranch, a city park and two streets in bordering cities. Dr. W. W. Samuell purchased the first ambulance for the City of Dallas in 1911.

The school and the district became the focus of a prominent civil rights case in 1966 when three male students — Paul Jarvis, Phil Ferrell and Steve Webb — sued the district after they were ordered to cut their long hair in order to be admitted to school. The case was one of the first in which individuals sued a large urban school district to preserve their individual rights, and the cause was taken up by the American Civil Liberties Union as well as local retail pioneer Stanley Marcus. Marcus did not know the students, but saw their hairstyles as a fashion choice rather than a show of disregard for authority. The case was lost in the U.S. District Court, and despite a series of appeals leading to the U.S. Supreme Court, it was not overturned. The decision is still cited in court cases over constitutional rights.<ref name="young">Michael E. Young. "In '66, their hair triggered a to-do: Stylish Marcus proved an ally in band's battle to keep long locks," The Dallas Morning News, March 4, 2002.</ref>

Student life
The alma mater is "Hail Samuell High, Hail Samuell High", written in 1955 by a music teacher at the school. The school yearbook is The Torch and the school newspaper is The Sentinel. For many years, the seniors' annual memory book was The Senior Pub, a publication of senior moments which covered all levels of the school, from classroom funnies to athletics to activities.

Athletics
The W.W. Samuell Spartans compete in the following sports:

Baseball
Basketball
Cross Country
Football
Golf
Soccer
Softball
Swimming and Diving
Tennis
Track and Field
Volleyball
Wrestling

State Titles
Baseball
1965 (4A) 
Track and Field
1964 (4A)

Football
Headed by coach and athletic coordinator Steve Pierce, the Spartans play their home games at Pleasant Grove Stadium.

The Spartan football program has made the playoffs 18 times since 1990 and 25 times overall. The Spartans have won 11 city/bi-district championships ('59, '60, '62, '69, '88, '94, '99, '01, '07, '12, '16), reached the Area round of the state playoffs 6 times, the Regional round 3 times ('94, '01, '07), and the state Quarterfinals once (1962).

As of 2017, the Spartans maintain an all-time record of 328 wins, 312 losses, and 13 ties dating back to the 1956 season.

Baseball
In 1965, with coach James 'Pete' Lawless at the helm, the Spartan baseball team beat the El Paso Austin Golden Panthers 2-0 and the Brownsville Hanna Golden Eagles (formerly known as Brownsville High) 14–0 to capture the 4A state championship. According to records maintained by the University Interscholastic League, this is the only baseball state championship won by any DISD high school to date.

Track and Field
The 1964 Spartan track and field team, led by All-state recipient and star athlete Johnny Johnson, set a national high school record in the 440 relay.

 Demographics 
The ethnic makeup of the school in the 2018-2019 fiscal year was 79% Hispanic, 19% Black, 1% White, and 1% Other.

 Student Subgroups 
88.8% of the student population is categorized as being economically disadvantaged and 15.7% of the student population is listed as having special education.

 Feeder patterns 
As of 2017, Young Men's Leadership Academy at Fred F. Florence and Piedmont Global Academy (formerly John B. Hood Junior High) Middle Schools feed into Samuell High School.

 Notable alumni 

 Joan (Juricek) Wynne — Married Bedford S. Wynne, Sr. Co-founder of the NFL's Dallas Cowboys; Board Member of the Dallas' Cattle Baron's Ball; Founder of the 25th Largest Woman Owned Business (Wynne Enterprise and Wynne MotorCoaches)  in Dallas - Fort Worth; Original Board Member of the Susan G. Komen Foundation.
 John Ford Coley — partner in musical duo with Dan Seals; hits include "I'd Really Love to See You Tonight"
 Arcelina Publio Dias— noted Brazilian journalist from São Paulo, Brazil.
 Joe Dixon — Defensive back on The University of Texas 1963 National Championship Team.
 Michael Gunstanson — Noted Web pioneer/journalist. Was first to use Flash as an editorial tool, conducted chat with orbiting space station and conceived then conducted first triplecast (web, analog and digital broadcast) in nation's history.
 Wayne Harrison — Texas radio reporter jailed in 1979 in Longview, Texas for refusing to reveal a news source.
 James Hughey — Samuell High School principal from 1984 to 1989 & Dallas Independent School District superintendent from 1995 to 2000 and 2001 to 2003.
 Ron Jones — 1969 NFL tight end for the Green Bay Packers
 Joe Kendall — former federal judge (1992–2002)
 Russ Martin — Host of The Russ Martin Show, a radio program in Dallas.
 Carl Mitcham — professor of technology and engineering, now at Colorado School of Mines
 Dr. Gregory L. Pierson — Former elected official, International Consultant
 Steve Ramsey — Punter/Quarterback New Orleans Saints 1970, Denver Broncos (1971–76)
 Mark Reeves — "Dapper Bandit," robbed banks in the North Texas area from 1978 to 1988.
 Lulu Roman — Former Hee Haw'' TV show personality.
 Stephany Samone — 1986 Miss Texas and top 10 finalist for Miss America.
 Dan Seals — country and pop musician also known as England Dan.
 Morgana Shaw — television, theatre, movie actress.
 Dale Tillery — former Texas state representative for District 10.
 Mike Trent — former University of Texas Longhorn center fielder; set College World Series record by scoring 4 runs in 1983 game, helping win the title
 Sammy Walker — shot put collegiate record breaker at Southern Methodist University and athlete at the 1976 Summer Olympics.
 Bo Wayne Weaver — professional baseball player for Seattle Pilots, a forerunner of the Milwaukee Brewers
 Dwain Wilder — 1958 Noted builder of Appalachian dulcimers, inventor (three patents, in solid state device processing and lutherie), poet and essayist
 Stanley Hauerwas — world-renowned theologian.

References

Further reading 
  (opinion article)

External links 
 
 Dallas ISD listing for Samuell High School
 School profile (PDF)
 Attendance zone map (PDF)

Dallas Independent School District high schools
Public high schools in Dallas